Pandari Bai (1930 – 29 January 2003) was an Indian actress who worked in South Indian cinema, mostly in Kannada cinema during the 1950s, 1960s and 1970s. She is considered Kannada cinema's first successful heroine. She has acted as both heroine and mother to stalwarts such as Rajkumar, M. G. Ramachandran, Sivaji Ganesan. She was the heroine in Rajkumar's debut movie Bedara Kannappa and also Sivaji's debut movie Parasakthi. She has acted in over 1,000 films in Kannada, Tamil, Telugu and Hindi.  Bai was honoured by  Kalaimamani from the Tamil Nadu government. The following is a complete list of her films:

List

 Tejaswini (1962)
 Punithavathi (1962)
 Indra En Selvam (1962)
 Sri Sivarathri (1963)
 Shri Ramanjaneya Yuddha (1963)
 Sant Tukaram (1963)
 Shree Guruvayoorappan (1964)
 Pratigne (1964)
 Pathiye Daiva (1964)
 Navajeevana (1964)
 Muriyada Mane (1964)
 Annapoorna (1964)
 [[Satya Harishchandra (Telugu film)|Satya Harishchandra]] (1965)
 Mahasati Ansuya (1965)
 Maha Sathi (1965)
 Chandrahasa (1965/II)
 Bettada Huli (1965)
 Shri Kannika Parameshwari Kathe (1966)
 Sandhya Raga (1966)
 Nadu Iravil (1966)
 Motor Sundaram Pillai (1966)
 Laadla (1966)
 Belli Moda (1967)
 Shri Purandaradasaru (1967)
 Punyavati (1967)
 Premalopramadam (1967)
 Penn Entral Penn (1967)
 Anuradha (1967)
 [[Raaz (1967 film)]] (1967)
 Pudhiya Bhoomi (1968)
 Palamanasulu (1968)
 Anbu Vazhi (1968)
 Amma (1968)
 Suvarnabhoomi (1969)
 Odahuttidavaru (1969)
 Nanha Farishta (1969)
 Nam Naadu (1969)
 Deiva Magan (1969)
 Namma Makkalu (1969)
 Manashanti (1969)
 Madhura Milana (1969)
 Gejje Pooje (1969)
 Chowkada Deepa (1969)
 Bhagirathi (1969)
 Muru Muttugalu (1970)
 Bhale Jodi (1970)
 Aparajithe (1970)
 [[Sampoorna Ramayanam (1971 film)|Sampoorna Ramayanam]] (1971)
 Pratidhwani (1971)
 Namma Baduku (1971)
 Mahadimane (1971)
 Ganga Tera Pani Amrit (1971)
 Bhale Rani (1971)
 Bandhavya (1971)
 Anugraha (1971)
 [[Rakhwala (1971 film)|Rakhwala]] (1971)
 Vasantha Maligai (1972)
 Thavaputhalvan (1972)
 Shehzada (1972)
 Rivaaj (1972)
 Ranganna Sabatham (1972)
 Pandanti Kapuram (1972)
 Nijam Nirupistha (1972)
 Mathru Murthi (1972)
 Marapurani Talli (1972)
 Kodalu Pilla (1972)
 Hridayasangama (1972)
 Apna Desh (1972)
 Dhakam (1972)
 Daiva Sankalpam (1972)
 Bandagi (1972)
 Aval (1972)
 Annamitta Kai (1972)
 Neramu Siksha (1973)
 Nee Ulla Varai (1973)
 Hemareddy Mallamma (1973)
 Gauravam (1973)
 Thirumangalyam (1974)
 Thayi Pirandhal (1974)
 Ramaiah Thandri (1974)
 Peddalu Marali (1974)
 Paadha Poojai (1974)
 Onne Onnu Kanne Kannu (1974)
 Netru Indru Nalai (1974)
 Krishnaveni (1974)
 Janma Rahasyam (1974)
 Gumastavin Magal (1974)
 [[Devadasu (1974 film)|Devadasu]] (1974)
 Avalum Penn Dhaney (1974)
 [[Alluri Seetharama Raju (1974 film)|Alluri Seetharama Raju]] (Telugu, 1974)
 Thota Ramudu (1975)
 Santhanam Saubhagyam (1975)
 Ramuni Minchina Ramudu (1975)
 Raktha Sambandhalu (1975)
 Puttinti Gauravam (1975)
 Pattikkaattu Raja (1975)
 Pallandhu Vazhga (1975)
 Padmaragam (1975)
 Moguda Pellamma (1975)
 Katha Nayakuni Katha (1975)
 Idhayakkani (1975)
 Doctor Siva (1975)
 Asthi Kosam (1975)
 Anna Dammula Katha (1975)
 Uzhaikum Karangal (1976)
 Uthaman (1976)
 Swami Drohulu (1976)
 Seetamma Santhanam (1976)
 Raju Vedale (1976)
 Perum Pukazhum (1976)
 Neram Nadhikadu Akalidi (1976)
 Muthyala Pallaki (1976)
 Muthana Muthallava (1976)
 Mugiyada Kathe (1976)
 Maa Daivam (1976)
 Lalitha (1976)
 Kaenelum Collectorum (1976)
 Etharkum Thuninthavan (1976)
 Bangaru Manishi (1976)
 Badra Kali (1976)
 Avan Oru Charitram (1976)
 Athirshtam Azhaikkirathu (1976)
 America Ammayi (Telugu, 1976)
 Ramarajyamlo Rakthapasam (1976)
 Uyarnthavargal (1977)
 Thani Kudithanam (1977)
 Thaliya Salangaiya (1977)
 Seeta Rama Vanavasam (Telugu, 1977)
 Punniyam Seithaval (1977)
 Punitha Anthoniar (1977)
 Palabhisekham (1977)
 Oke Raktham (1977)
 Manavadi Kosam (1977)
 Maa Iddari Katha (1977)
 Indru Pol Endrum Vazhga (1977)
 Geetha Sangeetha (1977)
 Eenati Bandham Yenatido (1977)
 Dongalaku Donga (1977)
 Aarupushpangal (1977)
 Vazhthungal (1978)
 Unakkum Vazhvu Varum (1978)
 Taxi Driver (1978)
 Swarg Narak (1978)
 Swargaseema (1978)
 Sommokadidhi Sokokadidhi (Telugu, 1978)
 Sahasavantudu (1978)
 Prema Chesina Pelli (1978)
 Oru Veedu Oru Ulagam (1978)
 Nindu Manishi (1978)
 Moodu Puvvulu Aaru Kayalu (1978)
 Makkal Kural (1978)
 Lawyer Vishwanath (Telugu, 1978)
 Lambadolla Ramadasu (Telugu, 1978)
 Kumkumam Kadhai Solgiradhu (1978)
 Kamatchiyin Karunai (1978)
 Kalanthakulu (1978)
 Dudubasavanna (1978)
 Dongala Veta (1978)
 Devadasi (1978)
 Chadurangam (1978)
 Bandhipotu Mutha (1978)
 Vetagadu (Telugu, 1979)
 Shringara Ramudu (1979)
 Sankhu Teertham (1979)
 Priya Bandhavi (1979)
 Naan Vaazha Vaippen (1979)
 Khiladi Krishnudu (1979)
 Kadamai Nenjam (1979)
 Dongalaku Saval (1979)
 Burripalem Bullodu (1979)
 Laxmi Pooja (1979)
 Lok Parlok (Hindi, 1979)
 Yamanukku Yaman (1980)
 Trilok Sundari (1980)
 Triloka Sundari (1980)
 Superman (1980)
 Sardar Papa Rayudu (1980)
 Rama Parashurama (1980)
 Pennukku Yar Kaval (1980)
 Naan Potta Savaal (Tamil, 1980)
 Mr. Rajanikant (1980)
 Mother (1980)
 Hema Hemeelu (1980)
 Guru (1980)
 Gajadonga (1980)
 Dharma Chakram (1980)
 Bangaru Lakshmi (1980)
 Kottapeta Rowdy (1980)
 Jyoti Bane Jwala (1980)
 Taxi Driver (1981)
 Sathyam Sundaram (1981)
 Rama Lakshman (1981)
 Ramakrishnamanulu (1981)
 Oru Iravu Oru Paravai (1981)
 Main Aur Mera Haathi (1981)
 Keralida Simha (1981)
 Kanneer Pookal (1981)
 Daari Thappinete Manishi (1981)
 Chhaya (1981)
 [[Antha (1981 film)|Antha]] (1981)
 Yeh Rishta Na Tootay (1981)
 Chettaniki Kallu Levu (1981)
 Vayyari Bhamulu Vagalamari Bhartulu (1982)
 Kalavari Samsaram (1982)
 Chelisuva Modagalu (1982)
 Ajit (1982)
 Radha My Darling (1982)
 Thyagi (1982)
 Vellai Roja (1983)
 Shri Ranganeethulu (1983)
 Sasthi Viratam (1983)
 Saatchi (1983)
 Raghu Ramudu (1983)
 Raagangal Maruvathillai (1983)
 Pralaya Garjanai (1983)
 Palletoori Pidugu (Telugu, 1983)
 Mayagadu (Telugu, 1983)
 Malargalile Aval Malligal (1983)
 Lalitha (1983)
 Koteeshwarudu (1983)
 Kaliyuga Daivam (1983)
 Ennai Paar Enn Azhagai Paar (1983)
 Dharma Poratam (Telugu, 1983)
 Amayakudu Kadhu Asadhyudu (Telugu, 1983)
 Amarajeevi (1983)
 Adadani Saval (1983)
 Vetri (1984)
 Vasantha Geetam (1984)
 Naga Bhairava (1984)
 Idhey Naa Savaal (1984)
 Amayakudu Kadu Aggi Bharothalu (1984)
 Sree Raaghavendar (1985)
 Ragile Gundelu (Telugu, 1985)
 Pudhu Yugam (1985)
 Nyayada Kannu (1985)
 Mel Maruvathur Adi Parasakthi (1985)
 Jhansi Rani (1985)
 Hosa Neeru (1985)
 Arthamulla Asaigal (1985)
 Andha Oru Nimidam (1985)
 Ramrajyadalli Rakshasaru (1990)
 Mannan(1992)
 Manikantana Mahime (1993)
 Mahashakti Maye (1994)
 taher the great'' (2019)

References

External links

Indian filmographies
Actress filmographies